Fortaleza de São Miguel or Saint Michael Fortress was a Portuguese fortress built in the Ingombota District of Luanda, Angola. During Dutch rule in Angola between 1641 and 1648, the fort was known as Fort Aardenburgh.

History 
São Miguel fort was built in 1576 by Paulo Dias de Novais.  It became the administrative center of the colony in 1627 and was a major outlet for slave traffic to Brazil. The fort was for many years a self-contained town protected by thick walls encrusted with cannons. Inside the fort, elaborate ceramic tiles tell the story of Angola from early years, and in the courtyard are large, imposing statues of Portugal's first king, the first European to reach Angola, Diogo Cão, renowned explorer Vasco da Gama and other notables.

Until 1975, the fortress served as the headquarters of the Commander-in-Chief of the Portuguese Armed Forces in Angola.

Today, it holds the Museum of the Armed Forces. Between 1938 and 1958 it held the Museu de Angola, until it was moved and renamed Museu Nacional de História Militar.

See also 

 Colonial history of Angola

External links
Museum of the Armed Forces, short English description

References

Municipalities in Luanda
Buildings and structures in Luanda
1576 establishments in the Portuguese Empire
Sao Miguel
Portuguese Angola
Sao Miguel